Bathsheba at the Fountain is a painting by Peter Paul Rubens completed around 1635.

Subject
The central figure is Bathsheba, a character from the Bible. She was the wife of Uriah the Hittite. The story, related in  describes how King David, who is shown as a small figure on a balcony in the top left corner, saw Bathsheba bathing and fell in love with her. This painting shows her receiving the letter from David, inviting her for a discreet meeting being delivered.

Bathsheba is attended by a maid who is combing her hair. There is also an African servant who is delivering David's letter. A dog is at her feet. Bathsheba is smiling and looking into the distance.

References

1630s paintings
Paintings by Peter Paul Rubens
Paintings depicting Bathsheba
Collections of the Gemäldegalerie Alte Meister